Peter Rawlinson may refer to:
 Peter Rawlinson, Baron Rawlinson of Ewell (1919–2006), British politician, barrister, and author
 Peter Rawlinson (engineer), Welsh-born engineer for Lucid Motors

See also
 Rawlinson